McLemore is a Scottish surname, possibly derived from an anglicisation of the Gaelic name Mac Gille Mhoire (meaning "Son of the Follower of the Virgin Mary"), the same origin as the name Gilmour. Notable people with this surname include:

A. Jeff McLemore (1857–1929), American newspaper publisher, State Representative and United States Representative from Texas
Albert S. McLemore (born 1869), American officer serving in the United States Marine Corps during the Spanish–American War
Amos McLemore (died 1863) Jones County, MS anti-secessionist who became commander of a Confederate company, the Rosin Heels
Ben McLemore (born 1993), American basketball player
Dana McLemore (born 1960), former professional American football cornerback in the National Football League
Doris McLemore (1927–2016), the last fluent speaker of the Wichita language of the Great Plains of North America
Emmett McLemore, professional football player who played in the National Football League
James McLemore, Alabama preacher and co-founder of the Alabama Baptist Association
 John B. McLemore (died 2015), American antiquary horologist and polymath and central figure of the podcast S-Town
Lamonte McLemore (born 1939) is an American vocalist and a founding member of The 5th Dimension, a popular vocal group of the late 1960s and early 1970s
Leslie B. McLemore (born 1940), civil rights activist and political leader in Jackson, Mississippi
Mark McLemore (born 1964), former second baseman and utility player in Major League Baseball
J.P. McLemore (born 1984), American Artist and activist with a background in journalism and Shinobi traditional Martial Arts from multiple ryu-ha. He is the current head of 2 Japanese clans that were combined- Sasaki Clan and rokkaku Clan.
Mark McLemore (pitcher) (born 1980), Major League Baseball pitcher
McCoy McLemore (1942–2009), American former college and professional basketball star of the 1960s and 1970s
Monica McLemore (born 1969), American nurse and academic
Thomas McLemore (born 1970), American football player
Kaelon McLemore (born 1995), Author,Commissioner, Public speak,
The McLemore clan has multiple coat of arms and standards all of which contend for a historical spot. The Clan Motto has remained the same for generations without contending. The McLemore Clan Motto: Perseveranti dabitur
Motto Translation: "It will be given with perseverance."
The clan has become largest in Canada and North America with many African Americans and Native American clan members. The current head of Clan McLemore is an American by the Name of Marc Anthony McLemore, whom received his Chiefdom from his father Paul C. McLemore upon his death in December 2018. Paul had a master's degree in History and Library studies, and upon family tree research was told by a Scottish source, that he was indeed the "son of the Chief." As of 2019 attempts to have a McLemore clan Gathering and highland game festival are on hold until further notice due to the COVID-19 outbreak. A new proper and permanent coat of arms will be voted on at the event when it finally takes place.

See also
Macklemore, American rapper and musician

Surnames of Scottish origin

Scottish Gaelic-language surnames